Staryi Aidar is a village in Shchastia Raion (district) in Luhansk Oblast of eastern Ukraine, at about 20 km NW from the centre of Luhansk city.

The War in Donbas, that started in mid-April 2014, has brought along both civilian and military casualties. One Ukrainian serviceman was wounded in action near the village on 15 December 2016.

Demographics
In 2001 the village had 633 inhabitants. Native language as of the Ukrainian Census of 2001:
Ukrainian — 10.25%
Russian 89.75%

References

Starobelsky Uyezd

Villages in Shchastia Raion
Populated places established in 1645